Habanastation is a 2011 Cuban drama film directed by Ian Padrón. Filmed in a slum in western Havana, the film addresses inequalities in Cuba through the relationship between two children of different social strata. The film was selected as the Cuban entry for the Best Foreign Language Film at the 84th Academy Awards, but did not make the final shortlist.

Cast
 Claudia Alvariño as Maestra Claudia
 Rubén Araujo as Compinche del ñato
 Blanca Rosa Blanco as Moraima
 René de la Cruz Jr. as Director de Escuela
 Ernesto Escalona as Mayito
 Pedro Fernández as Chofer de Guagua
 Rigoberto Ferrera as Chofer Almendrón
 Andy Fornanis as Carlos Roqued

See also
 List of submissions to the 84th Academy Awards for Best Foreign Language Film
 List of Cuban submissions for the Academy Award for Best Foreign Language Film

References

External links
 

2011 films
2011 drama films
2010s Spanish-language films
Cuban drama films